Major Guy Vernon Goodliffe  (17 September 1883 – 29 May 1963) was a career officer in the British Army and an English cricketer.  Goodliffe's batting and bowling styles are unknown.  He was born at Kensington, London and was educated at Charterhouse School.

Cricket
Goodliffe made his debut for Berkshire in the 1901 Minor Counties Championship against Buckinghamshire.  Later, while studying at the University of Oxford, Goodliffe made a single first-class appearance for Oxford University Cricket Club against Somerset at University Parks in 1904. During this match, he was dismissed for a duck by Talbot Lewis in Oxford University's first-innings.  He took two wickets during the match, those of George Barne in Somerset's first-innings, and Gerard Hodgkinson in their second-innings, with Oxford University winning by an innings and 45 runs. This was his only first-class appearance for the university.  He continued to play for Berkshire during this period, with him playing for the county until 1907.  He made a total of ten Minor Counties Championship appearances.

Military career
Having been on the Unattached List for Auxiliary Forces in 1906, during which he was granted the rank of 2nd Lieutenant, Goodliffe was enlisted in the Royal Fusiliers, still with the rank of 2nd Lieutenant in 1907. He later obtained the rank of Captain, and October 1916 he was an Acting Major. The following year he relinquished his rank of Acting Major and reverted to captain. By this point he had been awarded the Military Cross.  In 1918, he was again given the rank of Major on a temporary basis, Following the war, he became an instructor of English at French military schools. In 1926, he was seconded for duty as an officer of a Contingent of Gentlemen Cadets at the Royal Military College, Sandhurst. His appointment to the college was relinquished in September 1930, retiring from active service in that same month. Upon retirement he was granted the rank of Major.

Despite retiring, his experience was later called upon when he served in World War II as a Major with the Royal Artillery. He retired for a second time in July 1948. He died on 29 May 1963 at Derry, County Londonderry, Northern Ireland.

References

External links
Guy Goodliffe at ESPNcricinfo
Guy Goodliffe at CricketArchive

1883 births
1963 deaths
People from Kensington
People educated at Charterhouse School
Alumni of Magdalen College, Oxford
English cricketers
Berkshire cricketers
Oxford University cricketers
Royal Fusiliers officers
British Army personnel of World War I
Recipients of the Military Cross
British Army personnel of World War II
Royal Artillery officers
Academics of the Royal Military College, Sandhurst